The River Rye may refer to:

River Rye (Ireland), a tributary of the River Liffey
River Rye, Yorkshire, a river in the English county of North Yorkshire